Mesolakkos is a village of the Grevena municipality. At the 1997 local government reform it became part of the municipality of Grevena. The 2011 census recorded 49 residents in the village. Mesolakkos is a part of the community of Kalochi.

See also
 List of settlements in the Grevena regional unit

References

Populated places in Grevena (regional unit)